Tinker Park is the name of a former baseball ground located in Indianapolis, Indiana. The ground was the primary home of the Indianapolis Hoosiers baseball club of the National League from 1887 to 1889, and also of the Indianapolis Blues of the American Association in 1884.

The ballpark was named for Tinker Street, its adjacent street to the south, which was later renamed Seventh Street and then 16th Street. Other names for the ballpark were Athletic Park and Seventh Street Park. Other bordering streets were Mississippi Street (now Senate Avenue) to the west, Tennessee Street (now Capitol Avenue) to the east, and 9th Street (now 18th Street) to the north.

In 1884 and 1887, home plate was located in the southeast corner of the site. In 1888, it was moved to the southwest corner.

The ballpark was used for weekday games. Due to blue laws, Sunday games were staged outside the city limits in Bruce Grounds (1887) and Indianapolis Park (1888–1889).

The ballpark site is now occupied by the Methodist Hospital of Indianapolis.

See also
List of baseball parks in Indianapolis

References

Sources
Peter Filichia, Professional Baseball Franchises, Facts on File, 1993.

External links
Sanborn map showing the ballpark, 1887; oriented to put north at the top

Defunct Major League Baseball venues
Defunct baseball venues in the United States
Sports venues in Indianapolis
Defunct sports venues in Indiana